Oommen Mathew (22 December 1939 – 20 July 2013) was a politician from Kerala, India.

He was the Working Chairman of Kerala Congress (Jacob), a splinter faction of Kerala Congress. From 1980 to 1982, he was a member of the 6th Kerala Legislative Assembly (India) representing the Kuttanad Constituency. He was appointed the Chairman of Kerala State Housing Board in 1982, and held that position until 1986. In 2001, he again contested from Kuttanad constituency but lost to K.C. Joseph of LDF. At the time of his death, he was the Chairman of State Farming Corporation of Kerala.

Mathew died at a private hospital in Kochi on 20 July 2013 of a heart attack, aged 73.

Other positions held 

 President, All India Housing Development Association

 President, Thalavady Panchayath

 Chairman, Champakulam BDC

 Member, KSRTC Advisory Committee, Kerala State Transport Authority, Food Advisory Committee, Kerala State Archives Council

 President,  Kerala Karshaka Union

 General Secretary, Kerala Congress

 General Secretary, Democratic Indira Congress (Karunakaran)

References

1939 births
2013 deaths
Members of the Kerala Legislative Assembly
Kerala Congress (Jacob) politicians
Kerala Congress politicians